Hermann Otto Sleumer (February 21, 1906 in Saarbrücken – October 1, 1993 in Oegstgeest) was a Dutch botanist of German birth. The plant genera Sleumerodendron Virot (Proteaceae) and Sleumeria Utteridge, Nagam. & Teo (Icacinaceae), are named for him.

References

1906 births
1993 deaths
Dutch people of German descent
People from Saarbrücken
20th-century Dutch botanists